Blue Giant (stylized in all caps) is a Japanese jazz-themed manga series written and illustrated by Shinichi Ishizuka. It was serialized in Shogakukan's Big Comic from May 2013 to August 2016, with its chapters compiled in ten tankōbon volumes. A sequel, titled Blue Giant Supreme was serialized in Big Comic from September 2016 to April 2020, with its chapters compiled in ten tankōbon. A third series, titled Blue Giant Explorer, began in Big Comic in May 2020. In North America, the manga has been licensed for English release by Seven Seas Entertainment, which is publishing it in a two-in-one omnibus edition, and the first volume was released in November 2020.

An anime film adaptation by NUT opened in Japan in February 2023.

By August 2020, the manga had over 5.8 million copies in circulation. In 2017, Blue Giant won the 62nd Shogakukan Manga Award in the General category and the 20th Japan Media Arts Festival Award.

Synopsis
Dai Miyamoto, a high school student living in Sendai City, Miyagi Prefecture, has a straight personality, but he was living a student life without knowing what he wanted to do in the future. One day, he listened to a jazz song and became interested in it. He starts working part-time to buy a saxophone. His brother, Masayuki, who knew about it, bought a saxophone with a loan and gave it to him as a gift. Dai, who practiced the saxophone on the river bank after school every day, was invited to perform live by the owner of a musical instrument shop he met while buying reeds. He was yelled at by a regular customer that it was just loud and noisy, and he got off the stage in a daze and went home. After that, as he continues his daily practice, the master of the jazz bar where Dai has appeared introduces Yui, a music class instructor. Although he gave a lot of failing marks to Dai's performance, he was invited to come to his house next time, and Dai willingly accepted.  By attending classes, Dai's performance increased in power, and his delicate side also improved. Dai decides to move to Tokyo after graduating from high school to become a saxophone player, and invites the patrons of the jazz bar who yelled at him on the first stage before coming to Tokyo to listen to his current performance. The regular customer left the store after listening to the performance until the end while frowning.

Characters

Media

Manga
Blue Giant is written and illustrated by Shinichi Ishizuka. It was serialized in Shogakukan's Big Comic from May 10, 2013, to August 25, 2016. Shogakukan collected its chapters in ten tankōbon volumes, released from November 29, 2013, to March 10, 2017.

A second series, titled Blue Giant Supreme, was serialized in Big Comic from September 10, 2016, to April 25, 2020. Eleven tankōbon volumes were released by Shogakukan from March 10, 2017, to October 30, 2020.

A third series, titled Blue Giant Explorer, started in Big Comic on May 25, 2020. In March 2023, it was announced that the series is set to end in four chapters. The first tankōbon volume was released on October 30, 2020. As of February 10, 2023, eight volumes have been released.

In North America, Seven Seas Entertainment announced the English release of Blue Giant in February 2020. The manga is being released in a two-in-one omnibus edition. The first volume was published on November 10, 2020.

The manga is also licensed in France by Glénat, in Germany by Carlsen Verlag (starting with Blue Giant Supreme, which is set in Germany) and in Indonesia by M&C!.

Volume list

Blue Giant

Blue Giant Supreme

Blue Giant Explorer

Film
An anime film adaptation was announced on October 21, 2021. It is produced by NUT and directed by Yuzuru Tachikawa, based on a screenplay by Number 8, with character designs handled by Yūichi Takahashi, who will also serve as chief animation director. It was originally set to premiere in 2022, but was shifted to February 17, 2023.

Reception
By August 2020, the manga had over 5.8 million copies in circulation. In 2018, the 2nd volume of Blue Giant Supreme had 200,000 copies in circulation. In 2020, the 8th volume of Blue Giant Supreme had 200,000 copies in circulation.

Blue Giant was nominated for the 8th and 9th Manga Taishō in 2015 and 2016, respectively. The series ranked 15th on Kono Manga ga Sugoi! guidebook list of 2016 top manga for male readers. Blue Giant was nominated for the Yomiuri Shimbun's Sugoi Japan Award 2017. In 2017, the manga won the 62nd Shogakukan Manga Award in the General category, and won the 20th Japan Media Arts Festival Award. In 2018, the manga was nominated for the 22nd Tezuka Osamu Cultural Prize. Blue Giant Supreme won the Mandō Kobayashi Manga Grand Prix 2018, created by comedian and manga enthusiast Kendo Kobayashi. It ranked 41st on the 2018 "Book of the Year" list by Da Vinci magazine, and ranked 45th on the 2019 list. Blue Giant was picked as a nominee for "Best Comic" at the 46th Angoulême International Comics Festival held in 2019. Blue Giant was nominated for the French 14th ACBD's Prix Asie de la Critique 2020.

See also
Gaku: Minna no Yama, another manga series by the same author

References

Further reading

External links
 
 
 
 
 

2023 anime films
Anime films based on manga
Drama anime and manga
Manga adapted into films
Music in anime and manga
NUT (studio)
Seinen manga
Seven Seas Entertainment titles
Shogakukan manga
Winners of the Shogakukan Manga Award for general manga